The men's 4 × 100 metres relay event at the 1970 Summer Universiade was held at the Stadio Comunale in Turin on 5 and 6 September 1970.

Records

Results

Heats

Final

References

Athletics at the 1970 Summer Universiade
1970